Girl Named Tom is an American folk music sibling trio from Pettisville, Ohio composed of Bekah Grace Liechty (born August 2000), Joshua Liechty (born 1998), and Caleb Liechty (born 1995). 

They are the winners of season 21 of the American talent competition The Voice, with the distinction of being the first trio on the American version of The Voice to win the competition. They competed on the team coached by Kelly Clarkson, who won her 4th victory as a coach.

The band name was inspired by Joshua and Caleb's desire to have another brother and originates from Joshua calling their sister Bekah "Thomas" when she was a baby.

Career

2019–2020: Band formation and Another World 
Originally intending to go to medical school, all three siblings decided to form a band in 2019.

They released their first single, Barrier Island, independently in November 2019 and their first EP, Another World, the following month.

2021–present: Hits from the Road and The Voice 
On New Year's Day 2021, they released a second single, Backup Plan. In February, they released their first album, Hits from the Road, an album of covers. They released a holiday single, No Snow For Christmas, the day after the Voice finale, under Republic Records.

In September 2021, the siblings entered the 21st season of The Voice, singing "Helplessly Hoping" by Crosby, Stills, Nash & Young. All four coaches, Kelly Clarkson, John Legend, Ariana Grande, and Blake Shelton, turned their chairs for them. They chose to become members of Team Kelly. They made it to the finale & won the season on Dec. 14, 2021. They became the 1st trio ever to win The Voice. Their audition was the first audition, as well as the first 4-chair turn, of season 21.

On November 2, 2022, the siblings announced their second album, One More Christmas, would be released on November 11, 2022. They also shared that they would open for the Pentatonix "A Christmas Spectacular" Tour.

On December 13, 2022, the season finale of The Voice season 22, they performed the title track from their album "One More Christmas." Following the performance, "One More Christmas" reached number one on the iTunes Charts.

Discography

Albums

Extended plays

Singles

References 

The Voice (franchise) winners
Sibling musical trios
The Voice (franchise) contestants
Living people
Singer-songwriters from Ohio
American musical trios
American Mennonites
Mennonite musicians
Year of birth missing (living people)